Boone Township is one of nine townships in Boone County, Illinois, USA.  As of the 2020 census, its population was 1,993 and it contained 726 housing units.

Geography

Cities
 Capron

Unincorporated towns
 Russellville

Cemeteries
The township contains these four cemeteries: Capron, Chester, County Line and Long Prairie.

Major highways
  Illinois State Route 173

Demographics
As of the 2020 census there were 1,993 people, 694 households, and 525 families residing in the township. The racial makeup of the township was 68.49% White, 0.85% African American, 0.60% Native American, 0.20% Asian, 0.00% Pacific Islander, 16.96% from other races, and 12.90% from two or more races. Hispanic or Latino of any race were 31.51% of the population.

There were 694 households, out of which 50.60% had children under the age of 18 living with them, 40.92% were married couples living together, 11.38% had a female householder with no spouse present, and 24.35% were non-families. 18.30% of all households were made up of individuals, and 6.90% had someone living alone who was 65 years of age or older. The average household size was 3.23 and the average family size was 3.58.

The township's age distribution consisted of 30.5% under the age of 18, 9.3% from 18 to 24, 31.7% from 25 to 44, 21.7% from 45 to 64, and 6.9% who were 65 years of age or older. The median age was 30.5 years. For every 100 females, there were 123.2 males. For every 100 females age 18 and over, there were 120.7 males.

The median income for a household in the township was $80,000, and the median income for a family was $85,172. Males had a median income of $43,482 versus $24,364 for females. The per capita income for the township was $26,457. About 6.3% of families and 8.2% of the population were below the poverty line, including 9.9% of those under age 18 and 13.6% of those age 65 or over.

School districts
 North Boone Community Unit School District 200

Political districts
 Illinois' 16th congressional district
 State House District 69
 State Senate District 35

References
 
 United States Census Bureau 2007 TIGER/Line Shapefiles
 United States National Atlas

External links
 City-Data.com
 Illinois State Archives

Townships in Boone County, Illinois
1849 establishments in Illinois
Townships in Illinois